The 2016 Hawaii Rainbow Warriors football team represented the University of Hawaii at Mānoa in the 2016 NCAA Division I FBS football season. The team was led by first year head coach Nick Rolovich, who replaced Norm Chow. They played their home games at Aloha Stadium. They were members of the Mountain West Conference in the West Division.

With their 52–16 loss to Boise State on November 12, the team clinched their sixth straight losing regular season, a new school record. However, with a 14–13 victory over Fresno State the following week, they won their fourth conference game, their most since joining the Mountain West. It also snapped a string of five straight losing conference seasons. In addition, with the win against UMass, Hawaii became bowl eligible for the first time since 2010, because of the lack of eligible teams.

Schedule 

All attendances at Aloha Stadium are in tickets sold.

Notes

Game summaries

vs California 

Calling the game for ESPN: Allen Bestwick, Mike Bellotti (from Bristol) and Fox Sports Australia's NRL host Warren Smith (live on-site). It was produced by Foxtel.

at #7 Michigan 

Calling the game for ESPN: Mike Patrick, Ed Cunningham, and Dr. Jerry Punch. The 110,222 in attendance is the largest crowd to ever attend a University of Hawaii football game. The previous record for attendance was 107,145 during a game against Ohio State at the Ohio Stadium on September 12, 2015.

Tennessee–Martin

at Arizona

Nevada

at San Jose State

UNLV

at Air Force

New Mexico

at San Diego State 

On the call for CBS Sports Network: Rich Waltz, Eric Davis, and Cassie McKinney.

#24 Boise State 

On the call for CBS Sports Network: Rich Waltz, Adam Archuleta, and Cassie McKinney.

at Fresno State

Massachusetts

Middle Tennessee–Hawaii Bowl 

Calling the game for ESPN: Chris Cotter, Mark May, and Maria Taylor.

Personnel

Coaching staff

Roster

References 

Hawaii
Hawaii Rainbow Warriors football seasons
Hawaii Bowl champion seasons
Hawaii Rainbow Warriors football